Lake Township may refer to:

Arkansas
 Lake Township, Greene County, Arkansas, in Greene County, Arkansas
 Lake Township, Perry County, Arkansas, in Perry County, Arkansas
 Lake Township, Phillips County, Arkansas, in Phillips County, Arkansas

Illinois
 Lake Township, Clinton County, Illinois

Indiana
 Lake Township, Allen County, Indiana
 Lake Township, Kosciusko County, Indiana
 Lake Township, Newton County, Indiana

Iowa
 Lake Township, Cerro Gordo County, Iowa
 Lake Township, Clay County, Iowa
 Lake Township, Humboldt County, Iowa
 Lake Township, Monona County, Iowa
 Lake Township, Muscatine County, Iowa
 Lake Township, Pocahontas County, Iowa
 Lake Township, Pottawattamie County, Iowa, in Pottawattamie County, Iowa
 Lake Township, Wright County, Iowa

Kansas
 Lake Township, Harvey County, Kansas
 Lake Township, Scott County, Kansas, in Scott County, Kansas

Michigan
 Lake Charter Township, Michigan in Berrien County
 Lake Township, Benzie County, Michigan
 Lake Township, Huron County, Michigan
 Lake Township, Lake County, Michigan
 Lake Township, Macomb County, Michigan
 Lake Township, Menominee County, Michigan
 Lake Township, Missaukee County, Michigan
 Lake Township, Roscommon County, Michigan

Minnesota
 Lake Township, Roseau County, Minnesota
 Lake Township, Wabasha County, Minnesota

Missouri
 Lake Township, Buchanan County, Missouri
 Lake Township, Vernon County, Missouri

Nebraska
 Lake Township, Hall County, Nebraska
 Lake Township, Holt County, Nebraska
 Lake Township, Phelps County, Nebraska

North Dakota
 Lake Township, Cass County, North Dakota, in Cass County, North Dakota

Ohio
 Lake Township, Ashland County, Ohio
 Lake Township, Logan County, Ohio
 Lake Township, Stark County, Ohio
 Lake Township, Wood County, Ohio

Pennsylvania
 Lake Township, Luzerne County, Pennsylvania
 Lake Township, Mercer County, Pennsylvania
 Lake Township, Wayne County, Pennsylvania

South Dakota
 Lake Township, Aurora County, South Dakota, in Aurora County, South Dakota
 Lake Township, Clark County, South Dakota, in Clark County, South Dakota
 Lake Township, Codington County, South Dakota, in Codington County, South Dakota
 Lake Township, Corson County, South Dakota, in Corson County, South Dakota
 Lake Township, Marshall County, South Dakota, in Marshall County, South Dakota
 Lake Township, Roberts County, South Dakota, in Roberts County, South Dakota
 Lake Township, Spink County, South Dakota, in Spink County, South Dakota
 Lake Township, Tripp County, South Dakota, in Tripp County, South Dakota

Township name disambiguation pages